Professor Gorgi Sobhi (1884–1964) جورجى صبحى   Professor of General Medicine, Professor of the History of Medicine and Professor of Egyptology.

Early life
He was born in Mimon of Beni Suef, Egypt, where he lived with his father, who was a manager in an arsenal factory. His mother died a week after he was born. Dr Harper, the manager of Harmel Hospital in Cairo fostered Gorgi and the family brought him up as a twin brother to their own son who was almost the same age. He lived with the Harpers till the age of 9 and being brought up in an English family, spoke fluent English.

Academic career
He achieved first place in the 11+ exam in Egypt and later joined Medical School, qualifying from Qasr el Eini in 1904. Dr Sobhi became an Anatomist and wrote several papers in this field. In 1909 he came to London, but returned to Cairo two years later to look after his family following the sudden death of his father.

Between 1940 and 1952 he was Professor of General Medicine in Qasr el Eini. He qualified MRCP and later FRCP. He was also Prof. of Egyptology at the faculty of art at Fouad Ist university.

He pioneered asthma treatment treating it with gold injections, a breakthrough in his day. He loved the history of medicine and wrote extensively on the subject and later became Professor of the History of Medicine. He learned the Coptic language almost by accident. Mahdist War in Sudan obliged the Coptic Bishop there to flee to Egypt where he met Dr Sobhi and taught him Coptic.

He became a scholar in the language, so much so that Saad Zaghloul, the national Egyptian leader, asked him to write a manuscript on the language and it was printed at the government's expense in Arabic and in English. Dr Sobhi came across a rare old Coptic text on proverbs. He transcribed the book in one night and returned it to his owner. He was able to translate and publish the book later. He studied hieroglyphics, and became fluent in it. He taught demotic in the school of Egyptian Antiquities. He wrote the only book of its kind, Arabic words of Coptic and Greek origin.

He was fluent in seven languages: English, French, Italian, Arabic, Greek, Latin and Coptic; he could also read hieroglyphics. He learnt Italian while looking after the Italian prisoners of war during the First World War.

He was married to a French lady, and had no children; he was survived by a wealth of scientific and humanistic studies.

See also
List of Copts
Lists of Egyptians
 Coptic Medical Society U K

References
 Profile from Coptic Medical Society UK

External links
 Pioneer Coptic Doctors

1884 births
1964 deaths
Egyptian Copts
Coptic history
Coptologists
20th-century Egyptian physicians
20th-century Egyptian writers